Elvin Mammadov (born on 18 July 1988) is an Azerbaijani footballer (attacking midfielder) who plays for Sumgayit in the Azerbaijan Premier League. He made his national debut on 20 August 2008.

Career
On 24 May 2014, Mammadov signed a one-year contract with Inter Baku.
On 28 January 2016, Mammadov signed a six-month contract with Zira.
On 5 June 2017, Mammadov signed a one-year contract with Gabala FK.

On 11 June 2018, Mammadov signed a one-year contract with Sumgayit FK.

On 28 May 2019, Mammadov signed a two-year contract with Zira FK. On 2 February 2020, Mammadov left Zira by mutual consent.

On 20 August 2020, he signed one-year contract with Sumgayit FK.

Career statistics

Club

National team

International goals

Honours
Inter Baku
Azerbaijan Premier League (1): 2007–08

References

External links

1988 births
Living people
Association football midfielders
Azerbaijani footballers
Azerbaijan international footballers
Azerbaijan under-21 international footballers
Azerbaijan youth international footballers
Azerbaijan Premier League players
Turan-Tovuz IK players
Shamakhi FK players
Qarabağ FK players
FC Baku players
Zira FK players
Gabala FC players
Sumgayit FK players
Azerbaijani Shia Muslims
People from Tovuz